VANK (반크), an acronym for Voluntary Agency Network of Korea, is an Internet-based South Korean organization funded by the Korean government and established in 1999, consisting of 120,000 South Korean members and 30,000 international members. They refer to themselves as the "Cyber Diplomatic Delegation Group", and are mainly involved in spreading information about Korea to the world. They are politically motivated in their activities and frequently promote the Korean government's claims in various Japan-Korea and China-Korea disputes. Park Ki-Tae, founder of VANK, has said "the project is aimed at isolating Japan". VANK's membership consists mainly of junior high and high school students, although university students also participate.

Activities
Examples of campaigns they have conducted include organizing a protests movement to pressure Google and Apple to label the Liancourt rocks as Dokto on their maps and spreading the story of the ancient kingdom of Goguryeo, and about Jikji, the world's oldest extant book printed using movable metal type.

VANK publishes reading materials, postcards, maps, and videos. VANK's self-built online database and published books with information about Korea are acknowledged by overseas universities as recommended learning resources about Korea. As a way to exchange cultures and connect with foreigners, VANK also conducts surveys about their opinions of Korea, such as a notable survey about what aspects of Korea interest foreigners the most.

VANK disputes certain terms and information regarding Asian geographic names or about East Asian history. The head of the Voluntary Agency Network of Korea said the organization has corrected hundreds of mistaken statements by foreign governments about South Korea. VANK also raises awareness for Japanese war crimes and promotes the banning and removal of  symbolism they associate with Imperial Japan. 

In 2013, VANK launched a campaign against the Tokyo Olympic and Paralympic Games. The campaign included a letter to the International Olympic Committee (IOC) opposing the games because "Japan has no remorse for war crimes.”, the letter was also sent to major foreign media such as CNN and the New York Times. On January 6, 2020, a poster was put on a temporary fence on the site of the new Japanese embassy in Jong Chiyo Road, Nono District. In the posters, the Tokyo Games are contaminated by nuclear radiation, in one scene the Olympic Torch Relay is depicted with a man in a hazmat suit transporting radioactive material. They also produced stamps and coins with similar imagery.

In 2019, VANK launched a campaign against the expression Chinese New Year, recommending the term "lunar new year" instead.

In 2020, VANK urged Chinese netizens to stop cyberbullying Korean celebrity singer Lee Hyo-ri after her Instagram account received several complaints and criticisms. VANK posted an online petition titled "Stop China's cyber chauvinism which lynched a Korean celebrity!". It justified the petition on the basis "We oppose the chauvinistic attitude of attacking others in the name of nationalism, which includes interpreting even the smallest part of an expression in the most vicious and offensive way".

Funding
VANK is a non-governmental and private organization. According to VANK, they do not receive money from any organization or corporation, and are run by donations. In fact, they receive funds from the Ministry of Education, Science and Technology of South Korea, along with multiple corporate donors. The amount paid by the government has decreased, from 80 million won in 2006 ($1=W950 in 2006, around $84,000)to 30 million won in 2008 ($1=W1,300 in 2008, around $24,000).

Political position 

VANK does not represent an official political position, but the organization is believed to be politically closer to a liberal-to-progressive camp than to a conservative camp one. 

In South Korea, liberals and leftists tend to show more anti-imperialist and left-wing nationalist based diplomatic views than conservatives in diplomacy involving powerful countries, including China and Japan. Because of this tendency, conservatives support reducing VANK's government subsidies, while liberals and leftists support increasing VANK's government subsidies.

VANK has claimed that all of the Jiandao region is Korean territory, and that the territory was seized by the harmony of Chinese imperialism and Japanese imperialism.

VANK constantly insists on the Korean-centered view that Chinese/Japanese imperialism and hegemonism have robbed Korean territory and culture. VANK members have a sentiment that they believe that the view of Korea, a weak country, is politically correct because it is the most anti-racist and anti-imperialist in controversial issues related to China/Japan. Therefore, VANK opposes far-right racial conservatism or Korean ethnic-nationalism  that discriminates between Chinese and Japanese people in South Korea. They also staged a campaign in 2020 against COVID-19 related xenophobia against Asians in the United States and Europe, spreading anti-racism posters on Twitter and Facebook.

VANK is also related to the Christian movement in South Korea, so it also does missionary work.

Criticism 
VANK organizes young Korean students as "cyber diplomats" to lobby foreign organizations and webmasters about what it perceives as errors in matters related to Korea.  The Government of Korea endorses such "cyber vigilantism", subsidising a competition in which participants try to censor foreign websites for "incorrect" content about Korea. Park Jung-yul, an official of The Korean Information Service (KOIS) said "KOIS is resolved to monitor the contents of Korea-related Web sites and provide correct information on the Net in order to help generate an accurate image of the country." In Asia Times Online, it was reported that the South Korean government is offering rewards to students who participate in the activities of VANK, most of which are centered on the issues of the Sea of Japan.

VANK lists current targets for "correction" on its website for members to send a form letter of protest. Some of its requests for correction are justifiable, such as referring to a simple mistake mixing up North and South Korea. However, in relation to more highly contentious issues it does not accept any non-Korean interpretations. In a Foreign Policy article, VANK was described as being seen as "self-styled cyber fact-checkers" to those favourable to their cause but for others they are seen as "hyper-nationalistic spammers".

Although official foreign government agencies tend to endure its cyber harassment, numerous private organisations and websites surrender to silence VANK's clamour. An About.com spokesman, relating his company's decision to use the name "East Sea" to refer to the body of water otherwise known as the Sea of Japan, stated that they chose to use the name "not necessarily because it agreed with the South Korean geography activists but because the e-mail bombardment was annoying." In the About.com case, it received more than 20 e-mails per day for more than a year before it finally changed the name. Likewise, the National Geographic Society and other websites have changed their naming policies as a result of similar "e-mail and letter writing campaigns".

VANK has been accused of promoting Korea while attacking Japan. VANK has also been accused of attacking China and Chinese culture.

See also
 Internet-nationalism
 Liberalism in South Korea
 Identity politics (Korean nationalism)
 Anti-Japanese sentiment in Korea
 Anti-Chinese sentiment in Korea
 Cancel culture
 Gukppong
 Internet activism
 Irredentism
 Jiandao
 Korean claim to Tsushima Island
 Goguryeo controversies
 Liancourt Rocks dispute
 Spamming

References

External links 
Official website of VANK
Official Youtube channel

Non-profit organizations based in South Korea
Foreign relations of South Korea
Internet-based activism
Anti-imperialism in Korea
Anti-imperialist organizations
Anti-Japanese sentiment in South Korea
Anti-Chinese sentiment in South Korea
Christian missionary societies
Identity politics in Korea
Liberalism in South Korea
Liberal organizations
Left-wing nationalism in South Korea
Korean nationalist organizations
Internet-related controversies
1999 establishments in South Korea
Internet manipulation and propaganda